"Only When I Lose Myself" is a song by English electronic music band Depeche Mode. It was made exclusively for their 1998 compilation The Singles 86>98 and released as a single on 7 September 1998. It is the first non-album studio single since "It's Called a Heart" in 1985 and is also one of the rare singles to have two limited editions ("L" and "XL" – the others being "Enjoy the Silence", "In Your Room" and "Suffer Well").

Release
There are two B-sides on the single. "Surrender" was the first exclusive vocal B-side since "My Joy" in 1993 from the "Walking in My Shoes" single, and the other is an instrumental titled "Headstar". A rare remix of "Painkiller" from 1997 was re-released as a B-side on some versions. The release also includes a new remix of World in My Eyes.

The music video for "Only When I Lose Myself" was directed by Brian Griffin, who had previously worked with Depeche Mode as a photographer, and did the cover art for Depeche Mode's first five albums. The soundtrack to the video is a unique version of the song, fading out at the last chorus and omitting the instrumental outro (like the radio version), but including the instrumental intro (which is missing from the radio version).

Track listings

All songs were written by Martin L. Gore

12-inch: Mute / 12Bong29 (UK)
 "Only When I Lose Myself (Subsonic Legacy Remix)" (7:00) (remixed by Danny Briottet)
 "Only When I Lose Myself (Dan the Automator Remix)" (4:45)
 "Headstar (Luke Slater Remix)" (5:47)

12-inch: Mute / L12Bong29 (UK)
 "Only When I Lose Myself (Gus Gus Long Play Mix)" (11:21)
 "Painkiller (Kill the Pain Mix - DJ Shadow vs Depeche Mode)" (6:34)
 "Surrender (Catalan FC Out of Reach Mix)" (6:55)

CD: Mute / CDBong29 (UK)
 "Only When I Lose Myself" (4:35)
 "Surrender" (6:19)
 "Headstar" (4:23)

CD: Mute / LCDBong29 (UK)
 "Only When I Lose Myself (Subsonic Legacy Remix)" (7:00)
 "Only When I Lose Myself (Dan the Automator Remix)" (4:47)
 "Headstar (Luke Slater Remix)" (5:47)

CD: Mute / XLCDBong29 (UK)
 "Only When I Lose Myself (Gus Gus Long Play Mix)" (11:21)
 "Painkiller (Kill the Pain Mix - DJ Shadow vs Depeche Mode)" (6:34)
 "Surrender (Catalan FC Out of Reach Mix)" (6:55)
 "Only When I Lose Myself (Gus Gus Short Play Mix)" (5:06)
 "World in My Eyes (Safar Mix)" (8:30)

CD: Mute / CDBong29X (EU)
 "Only When I Lose Myself" (4:35)
 "Surrender" (6:19)
 "Headstar" (4:23)
 "Only When I Lose Myself (Subsonic Legacy Remix)" (7:00)
 "Only When I Lose Myself (Dan the Automator Remix)" (4:45)
 "Headstar (Luke Slater Remix)" (5:47)
 "Only When I Lose Myself (Gus Gus Long Play Mix)" (11:21)
 "Painkiller (Kill the Pain Mix - DJ Shadow vs Depeche Mode)" (6:34)
 "Surrender (Catalan FC Out of Reach Mix)" (6:55)
 "Only When I Lose Myself (Gus Gus Short Play Mix)" (5:06)
 "World in My Eyes (Safar Mix)" (8:30)
 This CD is the 2004 re-release

2×12-inch: Reprise / 44562-0 (US)
 "Only When I Lose Myself (Dan the Automator Remix)" (4:45)
 "Painkiller (Kill the Pain Mix - DJ Shadow vs Depeche Mode)" (6:34)
 "Headstar (Luke Slater Remix)" (5:47)
 "Surrender (Catalan FC Out of Reach Mix)" (6:55)
 "Only When I Lose Myself (Gus Gus Long Play Mix)" (11:21)
 "Headstar" (4:23)
 "Only When I Lose Myself (Subsonic Legacy Remix)" (7:00)
 "Surrender" (6:19)

CD: Reprise / 44546-2 (US)
 "Only When I Lose Myself (Dan the Automator Remix)" (4:45)
 "Headstar" (4:23)
 "Surrender" (6:19)
 "Only When I Lose Myself (Subsonic Legacy Remix)" (7:00)
 "Headstar (Luke Slater Remix)" (5:47)

CD: Reprise / 44562-2 (US)
 "Only When I Lose Myself (Gus Gus Long Play Mix)" (11:21)
 "Painkiller (Kill the Pain Mix - DJ Shadow vs Depeche Mode)" (6:34)
 "Surrender (Catalan FC Out of Reach Mix)" (6:55)
 "Only When I Lose Myself (Gus Gus Short Play Mix)" (5:06)
 "World in My Eyes (Safar Mix)" (8:30)

Charts

Weekly charts

Year-end charts

Release history

References

External links
 Single information from the official Depeche Mode web site
 Allmusic review 

1998 singles
1998 songs
Depeche Mode songs
Mute Records singles
Number-one singles in Denmark
Number-one singles in Hungary
Number-one singles in Spain
Songs written by Martin Gore
Song recordings produced by Bomb the Bass